Lasiobotrys is a genus of fungi in the family Venturiaceae. This is a monotypic genus, containing the single species Lasiobotrys lonicerae.

References

External links
Lasiobotrys at Index Fungorum

Monotypic Dothideomycetes genera
Venturiaceae